Eupithecia sewardata is a moth in the family Geometridae. It is found in Alaska.

The wingspan is 20–22 mm. The forewings light cream-grey, with faint, grey-brown antemedial and basal lines. The hindwings are similar to the forewings, but have a more blurred pattern.

References

Moths described in 1977
sewardata
Moths of North America